Patissa taiwanalis is a moth in the family Crambidae. It was described by Shibuya in 1928. It is found in Taiwan.

The forewings are grey, suffused with dark brown and with small black spots at both the upper and the lower angles of the cell.

References

Moths described in 1928
Schoenobiinae